Laccophilus fasciatus is a species of predaceous diving beetle in the family Dytiscidae. It is found in Central America and North America.

Subspecies
 Laccophilus fasciatus fasciatus Aubé, 1838
 Laccophilus fasciatus rufus F. E. Melsheimer, 1844
 Laccophilus fasciatus terminalis Sharp, 1882

References

 D.J. Larson, Y. Alarie, and R.E. Roughley. (2001). Predaceous Diving Beetles (Coleoptera: Dytiscidae) of the Nearctic Region, with emphasis on the fauna of Canada and Alaska. NRC 43253.
 Nilsson, Anders N. (2001). World Catalogue of Insects, volume 3: Dytiscidae (Coleoptera), 395.

Further reading

 Arnett, R. H. Jr., and M. C. Thomas. (eds.). (21 December 2000) American Beetles, Volume I: Archostemata, Myxophaga, Adephaga, Polyphaga: Staphyliniformia. CRC Press LLC, Boca Raton, Florida. 
 Arnett, Ross H. (2000). American Insects: A Handbook of the Insects of America North of Mexico. CRC Press.
 Richard E. White. (1983). Peterson Field Guides: Beetles. Houghton Mifflin Company.

Dytiscidae
Beetles described in 1838